J. C. Johnson House was a historic home located at Muncie, Delaware County, Indiana. It was designed by the noted Fort Wayne architectural firm Grindle & Weatherhogg and built in 1897. It is a large -story brick dwelling with Queen Anne and Romanesque Revival style design elements.  It features a projecting tower, two-story bay constructed of limestone, four slender chimneys, and a slate roof with decorative ridge trim.

It was added to the National Register of Historic Places in 1982, and was delisted in 2018.  It is located in the Goldsmith C. Gilbert Historic District.

References

Houses on the National Register of Historic Places in Indiana
Queen Anne architecture in Indiana
Romanesque Revival architecture in Indiana
Houses completed in 1897
Houses in Muncie, Indiana
National Register of Historic Places in Muncie, Indiana
Historic district contributing properties in Indiana
Former National Register of Historic Places in Indiana